Brebes Sundanese (Sundanese: Basa Sunda Brebes,) is the dialect of Sundanese language used by some people in Brebes Regency, Central Java, especially in the southern and southwestern parts of the region. The area of Brebes Regency is one of the districts in Central Java which borders the West Java region.

Language areas 
Areas with Sundanese speakers include the districts of Salem, Bantarkawung, Ketanggungan, Banjarharjo and several villages in Tanjung sub-district (Sarireja and Luwungbata), Larangan (Wlahar, Kamal and Pamulihan) and Kersana (Kradenan and Sindang Jaya) districts.

Brebes Sundanese is also spoken by smaller communities in several villages in Bumiayu (Pruwatan and Laren) sub-districts, Bantarkawung sub-districts (Cinanas, Cibentang, Karang Pari, Pangebat, and Bantarkawung), Ketanggungan District (Pamedaran, Baros, Kubangsari, Kubangjati, Dukuh Badag, and Kubangwungu), Banjarharjo (Banjarharjo, Cimunding, Ciawi, Tegalreja, and Banjar Lor), Losari District (Karang Junti and Babakan) and Kersana District (Kubangpari).

Daily use 
Sundanese speakers in Brebes Regency always use Sundanese as their daily language of instruction, both in the family environment and in the local community. In everyday life, such as buying and selling at the market, religious lectures at mosques, and traditional ceremonies (marriage, circumcision, thanksgiving, earth alms). Even so, the Sundanese language in Brebes Regency is only used in the spoken mode, not in the written format and until now the language is still well preserved by the speaking community.

An interesting habit that is carried out by some people in Losari, Banjarharjo, and several sub-districts in the South Brebes area is the tendency for people to do almost all their activities, such as going to school, seeking treatment, shopping, or other needs, more likely to do it to Ciledug District, namely the sub-district. which is in the east of Cirebon Regency rather than to the city of Brebes itself. This is because it is easier to get transportation to Ciledug than to Brebes. It is also influenced by the factor of the same language community which makes it easy to communicate and bond with one language.

Characteristics 
The difference between Sundanese Brebes and Standard Sundanese is prominent in intonation and some vocabulary, while at the level of phrases and sentences there is no difference. At the phrase level, for example:

 imah bapa = father's home
 peti suluh = wood chest
 budak bandel = brat
 hayang héés/pineuh = want to sleep
 ngakan/nyatu kéjo = eat rice
 gedé kacida = hugh
 jenuk/bera budak = many kids.

For example, the Brebes Sundanese sentence is:

 Misah/ambih lulus ujian nyanéh kudu di ajar = in order to pass the exam you have to study
 Iraha nyanéh mangkat = when are you going?
 Naha nyanéh telat? = why are you late?
 Mih, balik ti pasar = mother came home from the market
 Kakak geus indit = brother/sister already left

What is interesting is that some of the standard Sundanese vocabularies which include neutral vocabulary (not rough and also not polite) in Brebes Sundanese are always considered more polited. For example, the phrase;

 Hayang sare/pineuh = want to sleep
 dahar sangu = eat rice

In Sundanese Brebes is considered polite, even though in Standard Sundanese the two phrases mean neutral. The phrase that means wanting to sleep and eat rice in Brebes Sundanese is hayang héés and ngakan kéjo. In addition to "héés" to express the word "sleep", the word "pineuh" is also used in bantarkawung as its equivalent.

Comparison table of Sundanese Brebes and Standard Sundanese

References

Further reading

External links 
 Indonesian-Sundanese Translator

Sundanese language
Dialects of Sundanese
Languages of Indonesia